Haslett High School is a public high school located in Haslett, Michigan. It is the only high school in the Haslett Public Schools district. It is located a few miles northeast of Michigan State University on Marsh Road between Haslett Road and Grand River Avenue.

History 
In September 1900, a two-room brick building was constructed on present-day School Street near the current location of Vera Ralya Elementary School. "Haslett School" was taught in this building until 1910 when a second story addition was constructed adding more classrooms. In 1921, more additions were made and the school was named "Haslett Agricultural School." Continuous additions occurred until 1957 when "Wilkshire School," now the "Wilkshire Early Childhood Center," was built. Later that year—and the following year—land was bought for the building of a new high school south of Franklin Street. By 1958, Haslett High School was built with room for 400 students.

Notable alumni
 Lori Garver
 Jim Harrison
 Jake Lampman

References

External links
 Haslett High School
 https://haslettvikings.org/
 https://vikinglongboat.org/

Public high schools in Michigan
Schools in Ingham County, Michigan
1900 establishments in Michigan